Kshanny (Keşänne) is a rural locality (a village) in Novokalchirovsky Selsoviet, Aurgazinsky District, Bashkortostan, Russia. The population was 417 as of 2010. There are 7 streets.

Geography 
Kshanny is located 14 km northwest of Tolbazy (the district's administrative centre) by road. Dyurtyuli is the nearest rural locality.

References 

Rural localities in Aurgazinsky District